Mario Aguero (1 May 1924 – 22 June 2001) was a Cuban basketball player. He competed in the men's tournament at the 1948 Summer Olympics.

References

1924 births
2001 deaths
Cuban men's basketball players
Olympic basketball players of Cuba
Basketball players at the 1948 Summer Olympics
Sportspeople from Camagüey